Ma. Meryll Krysteen Rosales Serrano (born July 20, 1997) is a footballer who plays as a midfielder for Toppserien club Stabæk. Born in Norway, she plays for the Philippines national team.

Career

Youth
Serrano had her youth career at Haugar.

Haugar
In 2012, as a 14 year-old, Serrano made her professional debut for Haugar in a 3–0 against Hinna.

Avaldsnes
After playing for three seasons in the Norwegian Second Division, Serrano joined Toppserien club Avaldsnes. She scored on her debut against Røa a minute and a half after coming in as a substitute. Avaldsnes finished their 2015 season as runners-up in both league and cup.

Avaldsnes ended up finishing as runners-up in the Toppserien for three consecutive seasons. In 2017, Serrano helped Avaldsnes to win the Norwegian Women's Cup, winning her first title in her professional career.

LSK Kvinner
In 2019, Serrano joined the Toppserien defending champions LSK Kvinner on a one-year deal. LSK Kvinner ended up winning the domestic double in the 2019 season.

Arna-Bjørnar
After spending a season with LSK, Serrano joined Toppserien club Arna-Bjørnar on a one-year deal. In 2020, Serrano extended her contract for one more season. She was once again offered a contract extension in 2021, signing a deal until the end of the 2022 season.

International career
Serrano was born in Norway to a Filipino mother making her eligible to play for either Norway or Philippines at international level.

Norway U15
In 2012, Serrano received a call-up from Norway women's under-15 football team. She made her debut for Norway U15 in a 4–3 win against Sweden U15, coming in as a substitute replacing Eline Glamsland in the 41st minute.

Norway U23
Serrano received a call-up from Norway women's under-23 football team for the friendlies against Italy U23, England U23 and France U23.  She made her debut for Norway U23 in a 2–1 win against Italy U23, coming in as a substitute replacing Synne Jensen in the 89th minute. She scored her first goal for Norway U23 in a 3–2 win against England U23. More than a month later, she scored her second goal for Norway U23 in a 1–1 draw against China U23.

Philippines
Serrano was invited in the Philippines training camp in California. The training camp was part of the national team's preparation for the 2023 FIFA Women's World Cup.

In December 2022, Serrano 
scored her first senior international goal in 5–1 friendly win against Papua New Guinea.

International goals
Scores and results list the Philippines' goal tally first.

Honors

Club

Avaldsnes
Toppserien
Runners-up: 2015, 2016, 2017
Norwegian Women's Cup: 2017
Runners-up: 2015

LSK Kvinner
Toppserien: 2019
Norwegian Women's Cup: 2019

References

External links

1997 births
Living people
Citizens of the Philippines through descent
Norwegian women's footballers
Filipino women's footballers
Women's association football midfielders
Norwegian people of Filipino descent
Toppserien players